Leonard Levy (8 May 1939 – 11 April 2014) was a Jamaican cricketer. He played fifteen first-class matches for Jamaica between 1961 and 1974.

References

External links
 

1939 births
2014 deaths
Jamaican cricketers
Jamaica cricketers
Cricketers from Kingston, Jamaica